Claudia Gabriela Fontán (born October 4, 1966 in Hurlingham, Buenos Aires, Argentina) is an Argentine actress, host to radio and television. She has worked in several Argentine telenovelas, such as Sos mi vida, Son amores, Amor en Custodia, Los exitosos Pells and Los únicos. She also worked in Solamente Vos.

Filmography

Television Programs

Television

Movies

Radio

Awards and nominations

References

Argentine actresses
People from Hurlingham Partido
1966 births
Living people